Raygun Lounge is a gaming venue in Seattle's Capitol Hill neighborhood, in the U.S. state of Washington.

Description and history 
Raygun Lounge is a "gaming hall" in Seattle's Capitol Hill neighborhood. The venue offers arcade games and pinball, as well as food and drink options such as naan sandwiches, samosas, beer, coffee, and wine.

Raygun Lounge opened on East Pine in 2012, replacing Travelers Tea House. Stefan Milne of the Seattle Metropolitan described the combined space as "a bar, a pinball sanctuary, [and] a tabletop game shop".

Raygun Lounge has hosted various events, including a book reading in 2014 and a trivia night in 2017 in conjunction with gaming convention PAX.

References

External links

 

2012 establishments in Washington (state)
Capitol Hill, Seattle
Gaming